David Harel (born 12 April 1950) is a computer scientist, currently serving as President of the Israel Academy of Sciences and Humanities. He has been on the faculty of the Weizmann Institute of Science in Israel since 1980, and holds the William Sussman Professorial Chair of Mathematics. Born in London, England, he was Dean of the Faculty of Mathematics and Computer Science at the institute for seven years.

Biography
Harel is best known for his work on dynamic logic, computability, database theory, software engineering and modelling biological systems. In the 1980s he invented the graphical language of Statecharts for specifying and programming reactive systems, which has been adopted as part of the UML standard. Since the late 1990s he has concentrated on a scenario-based approach to programming such systems, launched by his co-invention (with W. Damm) of Live Sequence Charts. He has published expository accounts of computer science, such as his award winning 1987 book "Algorithmics: The Spirit of Computing" and his 2000 book "Computers Ltd.: What They Really Can’t do", and has presented series on computer science for Israeli radio and television. He has also worked on other diverse topics, such as graph layout, computer science education, biological modeling and the analysis and communication of odors.

Harel completed his PhD at MIT between 1976 and 1978. In 1987, he co-founded the software company I-Logix, which in 2006 became part of IBM. He has advocated building a full computer model of the Caenorhabditis elegans nematode, which was the first multicellular organism to have its genome completely sequenced. The eventual completeness of such a model depends on his updated version of the Turing test. He is a fellow of the ACM, the IEEE, the AAAS, and the EATCS, and a member of several international academies. Harel is active in a number of peace and human rights organizations in Israel.

Awards and honors

 1986 Stevens Award for Software Development Methods
 1992 ACM Karlstrom Outstanding Educator Award
 1994 ACM Fellow
 1995 IEEE Fellow
 2004 Israel Prize, for computer science
 2005 Doctor Honoris Causa, University of Rennes, France
 2006 ACM SIGSOFT Outstanding Research Award
 2006 Member of the Academia Europaea
 2006 Doctor (Laura) Honoris Causa, University of Milano-Bicocca, 18 May 2006
 2006 Fellow Honoris Causa, Open University of Israel
 2007 ACM Software System Award
 2010 Emet Prize
 2010 Member of the Israel Academy of Sciences and Humanities
 2012 Doctor Honoris Causa, Eindhoven University of Technology, The Netherlands
 2014 International Member of the US National Academy of Engineering
 2014 International Honorary Member of the American Academy of Arts and Sciences
 2019 International Member of the US National Academy of Sciences.
 2020 Fellow of the Royal Society (FRS)
2021 Foreign Member of the Chinese Academy of Sciences
 2023 Harlan D. Mills Award

See also
List of Israel Prize recipients
Members of the Israel Academy of Sciences and Humanities

References

External links
 David Harel's home page at the Weizmann Institute of Science.
 David Harel's page at the Israel Academy of Sciences and Humanities.

1950 births
Living people
Mathematicians from London
Israeli computer scientists
Israel Prize in computer sciences recipients
Israeli Jews
Fellows of the American Academy of Arts and Sciences
Fellows of the American Association for the Advancement of Science
Fellows of the Association for Computing Machinery
Fellow Members of the IEEE
Fellows of the Royal Society
Formal methods people
Graph drawing people
Members of Academia Europaea
Systems biologists
Software engineering researchers
Unified Modeling Language
Academic staff of Weizmann Institute of Science
Foreign associates of the National Academy of Sciences
Foreign associates of the National Academy of Engineering
Foreign members of the Chinese Academy of Sciences